Sergeant X (French: Le sergent X) is a 1932 French drama film directed by Vladimir Strizhevsky and starring Ivan Mozzhukhin, Suzy Vernon and Jean Angelo.

The film's sets were designed by the art directors Alexandre Lochakoff and Vladimir Meingard. Many of those involved with the film's production were Russian emigrants. It was remade under the same title in 1960.

Synopsis
An army officer returns home after being believed dead, only to find that his wife has remarried. In order to spare her feelings he enlists in the French Foreign Legion to serve in North Africa.

Cast
 Ivan Mozzhukhin as Jean Renault 
 Suzy Vernon as Olga
 Jean Angelo as Chardin
 Suzanne Stanley as Djanni
 Bill Bocket as Christophe
 Léon Courtois as Grégoire
 Nicole de Rouves as Jeanne
 Michel Monda as Georges
 Massazza as Truzzi
 Lars Birbach as Schwartz
 Tukchtiaeff as Shika

References

Bibliography 
 Crisp, Colin. Genre, Myth and Convention in the French Cinema, 1929-1939. Indiana University Press, 2002.

External links 
 

1932 films
French drama films
1932 drama films
1930s French-language films
Films directed by Vladimir Strizhevsky
Films about the French Foreign Legion
Films set in Africa
1930s French films